The 16th Central Commission for Discipline Inspection (CCDI) was elected at the 16th National Congress of the Chinese Communist Party on 15 November 2002. Its 1st Plenary Session elected the Secretary, deputy secretaries and the 16th Standing Committee of the CCDI.

Members

 Gan Yisheng
 Ma Wen (female)
 Ma Zilong (Hui) 
 Ma Zhipeng
 Ma Tieshan
 Wang Chengming
 Wang Tongzhuo
 Wang Huayuan
 Wang Shouting
 Wang Zhigang
 Wang Jianzhou
 Wang Xianzheng
 Wang Zhenchuan
 Wang Lili (female)
 Wang Weizhong
 Wang Deshun
 Yin Fengqi
 Bater (Mongolian) 
 Bu Qiong (Tibetan)
 Tian Shulan (female)
 Baima (Tibetan) 
 Feng Yongsheng
 Feng Jianshen
 Xing Yuanmin
 Zhu Weiqun
 Qiao Zonghuai
 Ren Zemin
 Liu Jiang
 Liu Fengfu 
 Liu Zhifeng
 Liu Xiaojiang
 Liu Fengyan
 Liu Jiayi
 Liu Xirong 
 An Limin (female)
 Sun Wensheng
 Sun Baoshu
 Sun Zaifu
 Yang Anjiang
 Li Wenhua
 Li Yufu
 Li Dongsheng
 Li Youwei
 Li Zhilun
 Li Chuanqing
 Li Yunzhi
 Li Jinming
 Li Jisong
 Li Xueying (female)
 Li Chongxi
 Li Qinglin
 Yang Guanghong
 Yang Duoliang (Hui)
 Wu Guangcai
 Wu Yuliang
 Wu Guanzheng
 Wu Yuping (female)
 He Yong
 Shen Shuji (female)
 Shen Deyong
 Zhang Yi

 Zhang Fenglou
 Zhang Shutian
 Zhang Enzhao
 Zhang Yuzhong
 Zhang Huixin
 Chen Xi
 Chen Peizhong
 Chen Jiping
 Fan Xinde
 Lin Wenken
 Luo Shiqian
 Yue Xuanyi
 Jin Yinhuan (female)
 Jin Daoming (Manchu) 
 Zhou Zhanshun
 Zheng Kunsheng
 Zhao Rong
 Zhao Chunlan (female)
 Zhao Hongzhu
 Hu Jiayan (female)
 Zhu Guangyao
 Zhu Chunlin
 He Bangjing (female, Bai) 
 Qin Shaode
 Nie Chenggen
 Jia Wenxian
 Xia Zanzhong
 Xu Chengdong
 Xu Jingye
 Gao Junliang
 Tao Fanggui
 Huang Danhua (female)
 Huang Yuanzhi
 Huang Shuxian
 Huang Shuhe
 Huang Xianzhong
 Cao Hongxing
 Cao Kangtai
 Chang Xiaobing
 Cui Huilie
 Kang Rixin
 Liang Yiping (female)
 Peng Xiaofeng
 Dong Lei
 Dong Wancai
 Dong Yisheng
 Han Changfu
 Han Zhongxin
 Fu Kecheng
 Jiao Huancheng
 Xie Zuoyan
 Lou Jiwei
 Xie Houquan
 Cai Changsong
 Zhai Xiaoheng
 Fan Shouzhi
 Teng Jiuming
 Xue Li (female)
 Wei Jianguo
 Wei Jiafu

References
General
The 16th CCDI composition was taken from this source:
  
Specific

Central Commission for Discipline Inspection
2002 establishments in China